Natarid Thammarossopon (born March 14, 1988), is a Thai retired professional footballer who played as a winger.

Honours

Club
Muangthong United
 Thai League 1 Champions (1) : 2012

References

External links
 Profile at Goal
 

1988 births
Living people
Natarid Thammarossopon
Natarid Thammarossopon
Association football wingers
Natarid Thammarossopon
Natarid Thammarossopon
Natarid Thammarossopon
Natarid Thammarossopon
Natarid Thammarossopon
Natarid Thammarossopon
Natarid Thammarossopon
Natarid Thammarossopon